In microeconomics, the expenditure function gives the minimum amount of money an individual needs to spend to achieve some level of utility, given a utility function and the prices of the available goods.

Formally, if there is a utility function  that describes preferences over n  commodities, the expenditure function

says what amount of money is needed to achieve a utility  if the n prices are given by the price vector .
This function is defined by

where

Features of Expenditure Functions 
(Properties of the Expenditure Function) Suppose u is a continuous utility function representing a locally non-satiated preference relation º on Rn +. Then e(p, u) is
1.   Homogeneous of degree one in p: for all and >0, 
4.   Concave in 
5.   If the utility function is strictly quasi-concave, there is the Shephard's lemma
Proof 

(1) As in the above proposition, note that 

  

(2) Continue on the domain  :   

(3) Let  and suppose . It follows immediately that . 

(4)Let  and suppose .

(5)

Expenditure and indirect utility 
The expenditure function is the inverse of the indirect utility function when the prices are kept constant. I.e, for every price vector  and income level :

There is a duality relationship between expenditure function and utility function. If given a specific regular quasi-concave utility function, the corresponding price is homogeneous, and the utility is monotonically increasing expenditure function, conversely, the given price is homogeneous, and the utility is monotonically increasing expenditure function will generate the regular quasi-concave utility function. In addition to the property that prices are once homogeneous and utility is monotonically increasing, the expenditure function usually assumes

(1) is a non-negative function, i.e., 

(2) For P, it is non-decreasing, i.e., ;

(3)E(Pu) is a concave function. That is,  

Expenditure function is an important theoretical method to study consumer behavior. Expenditure function is very similar to cost function in production theory. Dual to the utility maximization problem is the cost minimization problem

Example

Suppose the utility function is the Cobb-Douglas function  which generates the demand functions   

where  is the consumer's income. One way to find the expenditure function is to first find the indirect utility function and then invert it. The indirect utility function  is found by replacing the quantities in the utility function with the demand functions thus: 

 

where   Then since   when the consumer optimizes, we can invert the indirect utility function to find the expenditure function: 
 

See also 
 Expenditure minimization problem
 Hicksian demand function
 Slutsky equation
 Utility maximization problem
 Budget constraint
 Consumption set
Shephard's lemma

References 

 
 
 

Consumer theory
Expenditure